Myrtuntium or Myrtountion, called Myrsinus or Myrsinos (Μύρσινος) by Homer, was a town of ancient Elis. Homer mentions it among the towns of the Epeii in the Catalogue of Ships in the Iliad. Strabo describes Myrtunium as situated on the road from the city of Elis to Dyme in ancient Achaea, at the distance of 70 stadia from the former place and near the sea.

Others, however, they consider this identification unlikely and believe that Homer's Myrsinus should not be identified with Strabo's Myrtunium, but with a Mycenaean fortress known as the Dymaean Wall located south of the cape of Araxus.

References

Populated places in ancient Elis
Former populated places in Greece
Lost ancient cities and towns